Arsenije II was Archbishop of Peć and Serbian Patriarch from 1457 to 1463.

Arsenije was the primate of the Serbian Patriarchate of Peć and the last known Serbian Patriarch of the medieval era. During his tenure, the Ottoman Turks conquered the Serbian capital city of Smederevo in 1459, destroying the Serbian Despotate. After his death in 1463, a new patriarch was not elected and the Serbian Patriarchate of Peć entered a period of prolonged sede vacante.

See also
List of heads of the Serbian Orthodox Church

References

Sources
 
 
 
 

|-

Year of birth missing
1463 deaths
Patriarchs of the Serbian Orthodox Church
15th-century Serbian people